Ramin or Rameen, transliterated from Rāmin (Persian: رامین), is a Persian masculine given name of Zoroastrian origin. It is also an occasional surname. Notable people with the name include:

Given name 
 Ramin Bahrani, Iranian-American writer, director and filmmaker
Ramin Bayramov, Azerbaijani journalist
 Ramin Djawadi, Iranian-German composer of orchestral music for film and television
 Ramin Farahani (born 1969), Iranian-Dutch filmmaker
Ramin Ganeshram, American journalist, chef and cookbook author
Ramin Golestanian, Iranian physicist
 Ramin Guliyev, Azerbaijani footballer
Ramin Ibrahimov (born 1978), visually impaired Paralympic judoka of Azerbaijan
 Ramin Jahanbegloo, Iranian intellectual and academic
 Ramin Karimloo, Iranian-born Canadian musical theatre actor and singer
 Ramin Mehmanparast, the Ambassador of Iran to Kazakhstan
 Ramin Rahimi, Iranian percussionist
Ramin Takloo-Bighash (born 1974), Iranian mathematician
Ramin Toloui, American policy maker and portfolio manager

Surname 
Cathryn Jakobson Ramin, American journalist, investigative reporter, and author
Ezechiele Ramin (1953–1985), Italian missionary and artist
Günther Ramin (1898–1956), German organist, conductor, composer and pedagogue
Loga Ramin Torkian, Iranian musician
Manuela Ramin-Osmundsen (born 1963), French-Norwegian politician
Mohammad-Ali Ramin (born 1954), Iranian politician and writer 
Obaidullah Rameen (born 1952), Afghani politician 
Richard M. Ramin (1929–1995), American university administrator
Ron Ramin (born 1953), American composer for TV and film
Sid Ramin (born 1919), American orchestrator, arranger, and composer

See also 
 Vis and Rāmin
 Shahnameh (Iran's national epic, with a character by this name)
Ramin, Tulkarm Palestinian Town

Persian masculine given names